Modern Records (Modern Music Records before 1947) was an American record company and label formed in 1945 in Los Angeles by the Bihari brothers. Modern's artists included Etta James, Joe Houston, Little Richard, Ike & Tina Turner and John Lee Hooker. The label released some of the most influential blues and R&B records of the 1940s and 1950s.

History
In the beginning, Modern bought master recordings from other small labels. The Biharis also often used pseudonyms to give themselves writing credit on songs. Having started as an R&B label, Modern was later one of the few R&B labels to routinely cover rhythm and blues hits on other labels, apparently in an attempt to broaden their appeal and reach the popular market.

In 1958, the Bihari brothers formed Kent Records and stopped issuing records on Modern. In 1964, the Modern was revived and the Ikettes released a few successful singles in 1965, but the company became bankrupt a few years later and ceased operations. The catalog went with the management into Kent Records. This back catalog was eventually licensed to the UK label Ace Records in the 1980s and later sold outright during the 1990s. Ace Records of the U.K. now owns the tapes.

Management and staff
 Saul, Jules and Joe Bihari were the main people who ran the label. Their older brother Lester was only there sporadically.
Ike Turner was a talent scout and session musician for Modern Records in the 1950s. Artists Turner discovered for Modern include Bobby "Blue" Bland, Howlin' Wolf, and Rosco Gordon. According to B.B. King and Joe Bihari, Turner introduced King to the Bihari brothers which led to his RPM releases.
Tony Hilder was an A&R man for Modern Records in the late 1950s. Later he went on to form his own labels, first CT Records and later owner and president of Impact Records.
 Austin McCoy was an artist, session musician and recording session director with Modern Records. He left Modern in late 1950 to take up an A&R post with Mercury Records at their Beverly Hills office.

Albums
 Modern Music: The First Year – 1945 (1339 Ace, 2012)

The following albums were released in mono with catalogue numbers "M-70" and in stereo with catalogue numbers "MST-8":

 –00 Era of Tommy Dorsey
 –01 Era of Benny Goodman
 –02 Era of Charlie Barnet
 –03 Era of Glenn Miller
 –04 Era of Woody Herman
 –05 Era of the Big Bands
 –06 Dixieland
 –07 Polka Party Time
 –08 Honky Tonk Piano
 –09 The Strauss Waltzes
 –10 Day Dreams
 –11 Organ Gems
 –12 Cha Cha Cha
 –13 Sing-A-Long
 –14 Rock and Roll Party
 –15 The Heart of Spain
 –16 Oldies and Goodies
 –17 Progressive Percussion
 –18 Hawaiian Holiday
 –19 Era of Hank Williams
 –20 Tradewinds to Hawaii
 –21 Dynamic Percussion
 –22 Mambo Cha Cha Cha
 –23 The Fabulous Ink Spots

Selected singles

Subsidiaries
Crown Records
Flair Records
Meteor Records
RPM Records
Yuletide Records (Christmas music)

References

External links
 Crown Records Discography
 Modern Records Story
 Modern Records on the Internet Archive's Great 78 Project

Record labels established in 1945
Defunct record labels of the United States
Rhythm and blues record labels
Jazz record labels
Record labels disestablished in 1969